Rajesh Narwal is an Indian Kabaddi athlete.

Career

Pro Kabbadi League 
Rajesh Narwal played four seasons with Jaipur Pink Panthers and a title in the first season of Pro Kabaddi League. He was an essential part of their title-winning season where he played 60 games for the club. One of the top all-rounders in the league, he averages 4.43 raid points and 1.40 tackle points per match. A great asset defensively, Rajesh has converted 77 of his 183 tackles attempted. In the recent auction, he was sold to Team UP Yoddha for Rs. 69 lakhs. he scored 277 raid points and 100 tackle points he is third best all-rounder in pkl history. He currently is in the Dabangg Delhi K.C team.

In the 60 games he has played in the Pro Kabaddi League, he has got zero yellow cards and red cards till date. A quality not often seen in a completely physical sport like Kabaddi. Rajesh just does not rely on his Kabaddi skills and fame to sustain his family. He also works at ONGC in Sonepat.

References

1990 births
Living people
Kabaddi players from Haryana
Indian kabaddi players